The 12723 / 12724 Telangana Express, (formerly New Delhi–Hyderabad AP Express), is a Superfast Express of South Central Railways that runs between Hyderabad, capital of Telangana and national capital of India, New Delhi.

Timings
The schedule is given below:-

History
Until 1973 only two out of the four southern capitals had direct rail connectivity to the national capital. One is 15/16 Grand Trunk(GT) Express from Madras and another is 21/22 Southern Express (today's Dakshin Express) from Hyderabad since 1955. 
1. The New Train 123/124 Andhra Pradesh Express (Now Telangana Express) was introduced on October 3, 1976, from Secunderabad to New Delhi and inaugurated by Shri Madhu Dandavate who served as Minister of Railways. 
2. It takes less than 24 hours to reach Delhi which is shorter duration than the existing train 12721/22 Dakshin Express which takes 33 hours to reach Delhi. 
3. It passes through 6 states Telangana, Maharashtra, Madhya Pradesh, Uttar Pradesh, Rajasthan, Haryana to reach New Delhi station. 
4. It is the 2nd Train of Indian Railways which was named after a state. 
5. It was the fastest train between Hyderabad - Delhi until Rajdhani and Duronto express were introduced. 
6. It was called as "Blue Bullet" due to its unique livery in Oxford Blue colour coaches with a gold band in 1976. 
7. It was introduced with diesel locomotives at a time when most trains were steam powered. 
8. It is known for its service, punctuality, maintenance, quality food. 
9. It is the first 24 coach train of South Central Railways. 
10. Initially, it had 4 stoppages which has been now increased to 16. In SCR, it stops at 6 stations. 
11. The Telangana Express is still the most preferred train among the Delhi bound passengers, even though many trains exist like Rajdhanis and Durontos. 
12. After the Formation of Telangana State, Andhra Pradesh Express has been renamed as Telangana Express with effect from 15 November 2015. 
13. Telangana express was updated with brand new German design Linke-Hoffman-Busch (LHB) coaches, replacing the ICF design CBC coaches from 15 July 2019.

Gallery

Traction
In Both The Directions train will hauled by a Lallaguda based WAP 7 locomotive on its entire journey.

See also
List of named passenger trains of India
Hyderabad Deccan railway station
New Delhi railway station

References

Transport in Hyderabad, India
Transport in Delhi
Express trains in India
Rail transport in Telangana
Rail transport in Maharashtra
Rail transport in Madhya Pradesh
Rail transport in Uttar Pradesh
Rail transport in Haryana
Railway services introduced in 1976
Named passenger trains of India